Sanne Voets (born 17 September 1986) is a Dutch Paralympic equestrian. She is gold medalled at the 2016 Summer Paralympics and at the 2020 Summer Paralympics. Voets became also World Champion and European Champion and several times National Dutch Champion. She is the most successful -para-equestrian rider for The Netherlands in History.

Sanne Voets was the first rider who collaborated with a DJ to make a freestyle to music. On the music of DJ Armin van Buuren Voets won gold at the 2016 Paralympic Games in Rio de Janeiro.

Para-Dressage results

Paralympic Games

World Championships

European Championships

References

External links
 

1986 births
Living people
Dutch dressage riders
Paralympic gold medalists for the Netherlands
Paralympic silver medalists for the Netherlands
Equestrians at the 2012 Summer Paralympics
Equestrians at the 2016 Summer Paralympics
Medalists at the 2016 Summer Paralympics
Paralympic medalists in equestrian
Paralympic equestrians of the Netherlands
Equestrians at the 2020 Summer Paralympics
Medalists at the 2020 Summer Paralympics
21st-century Dutch people